Sir Nugent Talbot Everard, 1st Baronet (24 October 1849 – 12 July 1929) was an Irish senator nominated to the 1922 Seanad Éireann.

He was born 24 October 1849 in Torquay, Devonshire, England, the eldest son of Captain Richard Nugent Everard, officer in the British army, and his wife Barbara Everard (née O'Reilly) of Ballinlough Castle, County Westmeath. He was educated at Harrow School and Trinity College, Cambridge (MA 1875). In 1863, at the age of 13, he had inherited the family estate in Ireland at Randlestown, near Navan, County Meath. About 1870 he settled at Randlestown. He took up farming on the estate, at that time containing 2,311 acres.

In the general election of 1892 he stood as unionist candidate in the West Cavan constituency, but was not elected. In 1902 he was one of the landlord representatives during the 1902 Land Conference.
 
He was a lieutenant-colonel in the Prince of Wales's Leinster Regiment (Royal Canadians) regiment of the British Army, and was granted the honorary rank of colonel on 2 August 1902. He was also High Sheriff of Meath (for 1883) and Lord Lieutenant of Meath. He was a member of Meath County Council from 1900 to 1920.

In recognition of his involvement in public life, he was created a baronet on 30 June 1911, on the occasion of the coronation of King George V. In 1917 and 1918 he was a participant in the Irish Convention, and in 1920 he took part in peace negotiations in Dublin. In 1921 his efforts for the benefit of the public cause were recognised again when he was appointed by the lord lieutenant as a member of the newly created Senate of Southern Ireland. At the formal opening of the short-lived Southern Irish parliament he presided in the absence of the lord chancellor, Sir John Ross.

In 1922, Everard was nominated by the President of the Executive Council and sat as an independent member. He was defeated at the 1928 Seanad election but was re-elected at a by-election on 10 April 1929 to fill the vacancy caused by the death of William Sears. He died in office in July 1929. The by-election for his seat was won by Richard A. Butler.

Arms

References

External links

1849 births
1929 deaths
Prince of Wales's Leinster Regiment officers
Members of the 1922 Seanad
Members of the 1925 Seanad
Members of the 1928 Seanad
Baronets in the Baronetage of the United Kingdom
Irish unionists
Lord-Lieutenants of Meath
People educated at Harrow School
Members of the Senate of Southern Ireland
High Sheriffs of Meath
Independent members of Seanad Éireann